Jorge Legorreta Gutiérrez (Mexico City, September 4, 1948 – July 17, 2012) was a Mexican architect and urbanist. He was one of the main researchers on the relationship of Mexico City with his former lake environment and urbanism developed from it, as well as the problems in the management of water resources in the city. Also was the first government of Cuauhtémoc borough from 1997 to 2000.

References

Mexican architects
National Autonomous University of Mexico alumni
People from Mexico City
1949 births
2012 deaths